Antonio Trashorras (born 22 September 1969), is a Spanish screenwriter.

He collaborated on the screenplay of The Devil's Backbone, and Agnosía. He has worked in Spanish television.

References

External links
 

Spanish screenwriters
Spanish male writers
Male screenwriters
Living people
1969 births